Michel Hne is a footballer who currently plays for FCN Gaitcha in the New Caledonian football league. He has been playing as a goalkeeper, He currently plays for the New Caledonia national football team

External links

1979 births
Living people
New Caledonian footballers
New Caledonia international footballers
AS Magenta players
Gaïtcha FCN players
Association football goalkeepers
2002 OFC Nations Cup players
Date of birth missing (living people)